EBK is a drum and bass producer and DJ from London, England, with 10 years of releases on influential labels including Renegade Hardware and Dispatch Recordings.

EBK is an abbreviation for E-Blok, which was EBK's DJ name in his early teens. It plays on the fact he is of Polish descent, hence Eastern Bloc.

Biography

EBK cut his teeth as a teenager in the 1990s DJing Jungle on pirate and internet radio stations including Flex FM and interFACE (www.Pirate-Radio.org) before becoming the co-founder of Composite Records a label that at the turn of the millennium was an integral part of drum and bass's movement towards the rolling techno influenced subgenre now known as Neurofunk.

Following a number of releases on Renegade Hardware including 'Soma' and 'Blackboard Jungle' EBK came to prominence in 2007 with the release of '1000 Years' on Renegade Hardware's album 'Above The Game' along with his remix work for Sudden Def Records.

His tracks are played by DJs across the board and have got national radio support in the UK from broadcasters including Mary Anne Hobbs and the late John Peel.

Discography

Releases

 2000: Radium / Vision on Composite Recordings
 2000: Kerbkrawler / Motor City on Composite Recordings
 2001: 2000:2000 on Composite Recordings
 2002: Underwater Lazers on Heads of Industry LP
 2004: Hard Focus with Holdtight on Here Comes Trouble – Volume 12 | Trouble on Vinyl
 2005: Apparition with Vicious Circle on Black Out EP – Volume 1 | Defcom Records
 2006: Blackboard Jungle on Fear No Evil LP sampler | Renegade Hardware
 2006: Cruise Control with Vicious Circle on Something Sick LP | DSCI4 Records
 2006: Meltdown / Motel with Danny Holdtight on Tech Itch Records
 2006: Powder People / Vacuum with Prolix on Powder to the People EP | Industry Records
 2006: Soma on The Vendetta EP | Renegade Hardware
 2007: 1000 Years on Above The Game LP | Renegade Hardware
 2007: Lightly Salted (EBK Remix) on Sudden Def Recordings
 2007: Skatter on Detrimental EP | Renegade Hardware
 2008: Retina on Spy Technologies – Volume 5 | DSCI4 Records
 2010: Hybrid on Revolution Recordings
 2010: Mud on Dispatch Recordings
 2010: Clouds on Renegade Hardware
 2011: Mainframe with Octane & DLR feat. Gusto on Renegade Hardware
 2011: Zulu Fade with Octane & DLR on Dispatch Recordings

DJ performances

EBK has performed all over the United Kingdom and Europe, Thailand and India among other countries. In London, EBK is resident at club night Renegade Hardware.

His DJ sets cover a broad spectrum of styles often embracing elements including neurofunk, minimal, rolling and techno.

References

External links

 EBK at SoundCloud
 EBK at Twitter
 EBK at MySpace
 EBK Discography at Rolldabeats

English drum and bass musicians
English electronic musicians
English dance musicians
Club DJs
English DJs
1978 births
Living people
English people of Polish descent
Electronic dance music DJs